Oleksandr Ihorovych Matsievskyi (10 May 198030 December 2022) was a Ukrainian Ground Forces member and de facto captive executed by Russian soldiers during the Battle of Bakhmut in the Russian invasion of Ukraine in early March 2023. The video of the execution circulated online around 6 March 2023, showing a soldier without weapons, smoking a cigarette, saying "Slava Ukraini" and then being shot with automatic weapons from multiple sides. The 30th Mechanized Brigade initially named Tymofii Shadura as the victim and a video of the shooting was shared on social media. Later reports suggested Matsievskyi as a credible alternate identification, which was subsequently confirmed by the Ukrainian government.

Execution 
As of 6 March 2023, a graphic 12-second video showing an unidentified soldier in camouflage Ukrainian uniform, unarmed, standing in a shallow trench in a winter wood, calmly puffing a cigarette. As the man is heard saying "Slava Ukraini" ("Glory to Ukraine"), salvos of automatic weapons from multiple sides are heard and seen shooting the man, who collapses. Voices in the Russian language are heard saying "Die, bitch". Before the murder, he was allegedly forced to dig his own grave, in the video he is in a hole, and there is a shovel behind him.

Victim 
Open-source intelligence volunteers suggested more than six names for the man shot in the video. The captive and victim's identity was debated mainly between Tymofii Shadura and Oleksandr Matsievskyi for few days.

BBC News Ukrainian spoke to a family member who seemed to recognize him. A woman who identified herself as the soldier's sister said that her brother could "definitely stand up to the Russians like that" and that "he never hid the truth in his life, and he definitely wouldn't hide it in front of the enemy".

As of 10 March, Oleksandr Ihorovych Matsievskyi, a 42-year-old Ukrainian soldier deployed to Bakhmut in November 2022 and who also disappeared, remained a credible alternative due to contextual and visual similarities. Matsievskyi disappeared earlier while bearing similar bandages as the executed soldiers. Matsievskyi's territorial defense forces' comrades reporting his group of four soldiers went missing on 30 December 2022, following a failed counter attack on the outskirts of Soledar. Matsievskyi's body, heavily damaged by shots, was exchanged in January, returned to his village by February, and is now buried in Nizhyn, where he worked as an electrician. The local mayor, Matsievskyi's family and others claim to have recognized him in the video.

Despites calls to recognize Shadura or Matsievskyi posthumously as a Ukrainian hero, individuals in both Shadura and Matsievskyi's villages called for cautions and to wait for forensic investigations and official conclusions, sending empathic support to each others.

Matsievskyi was subsequently identified by the Ukrainian government as the subject of the video.

Reactions

Ukraine 
Ukrainian officials reacted quickly, calling to identify the killers and for International Criminal Court investigations.

On 6 March 2023, Ukrainian president Volodymyr Zelenskyy rapidly reacted to the execution as he released a video denouncing the crime. Later that day, the Main Investigation Department of the Security Service of Ukraine registered criminal proceedings over the video.

Prosecutor General of Ukraine Andriy Kostin said that criminal proceedings have been opened over the shooting of the prisoner under article 438, part 2 of the Criminal Code — violation of the laws and customs of war, adding that "[e]ven war has its own laws [...] There are rules of international law systematically ignored by the Russian criminal regime. But sooner or later, there will be punishment".

Ukrainian foreign minister Dmytro Kuleba called on ICC prosecutor Karim Khan to investigate the incident. According to Kuleba, the video is more "proof that this war is genocidal".

The Verkhovna Rada Commissioner for Human Rights Dmytro Lubinets emphasized that Ukraine's goal, as well as that of the entire democratic world, is to bring Russia to justice.

The Servant of the People party announced that once all the circumstances and identifying the deceased were established, it would send an appeal to Zelenskyy to grant the soldier the title of Hero of Ukraine posthumously.

On 12 March 2023, Zelenskyy conferred the title of Hero of Ukraine on Matsievskyi, posting on Twitter, "A Ukrainian warrior. A man who will be known and remembered forever. For his bravery, for his confidence in Ukraine and for his 'Glory to Ukraine!'".

Russia 
Russia has not publicly condemned the execution and continues to deny any war crimes during the invasion of Ukraine.

Others 
The execution has been commented by journalists in other countries. The soldier's attitude and the phrase "Slava Ukraini" in the face of enemy forces has been compared to the Snake Island "Russian warship, go fuck yourself" phrase early in 2022.

See also 
 Treatment of prisioners of war in the Russian invasion of Ukraine
 War crimes in the 2022 Russian invasion of Ukraine
 Third Geneva Convention
 Command responsibility
 Prisoner of war
 Maqbool Hussain
 Execution of Nguyễn Văn Lém

References 

1980 births
2022 deaths
2023 deaths
Ukrainian prisoners of war
Prisoners of war held by Russia
Ukrainian military personnel killed in the 2022 Russian invasion of Ukraine
War crimes during the 2022 Russian invasion of Ukraine
Anti-Ukrainian sentiment
Filmed executions